David Fine (born September 13, 1960) is a Canadian filmmaker, who works in animated film alongside his British wife Alison Snowden. The couple are best known as the creators of the Nelvana animated television series Bob and Margaret, and as the directors of several animated short films which have won or been nominated for Genie Awards and Academy Awards.

Fine originally worked in film alongside documentarian Ron Mann, receiving his first Genie Award nomination when The Only Game in Town was shortlisted for Best Theatrical Short Film at the 4th Genie Awards in 1983. He then spent time studying at the National Film and Television School in England, where he met and married Snowden. Fine assisted Snowden on her 1985 short film Second Class Mail. They then worked together on George and Rosemary, which was an Academy Award nominee for Best Animated Short Film at the 60th Academy Awards and won the Genie Award for Best Theatrical Short Film at the 9th Genie Awards.

Their 1989 film In and Out was a nominee for the Genie Award for Best Theatrical Short Film at the 11th Genie Awards.

In 1994 they wrote the screenplay for J. Falconer's animated short film Deadly Deposits, and released their own animated short film Bob's Birthday. The film won the Academy Award for Best Animated Short Film at the 67th Academy Awards, was a Genie Award nominee for Best Theatrical Short Film at the 15th Genie Awards, and formed the basis for the television series Bob and Margaret.

After production of Bob and Margaret was ended production in 2001, Snowden and Fine created and worked on the animated television series Ricky Sprocket: Showbiz Boy and Shaun the Sheep. In 2018 they released Animal Behaviour, their first theatrical short film since Bob's Birthday, which received another Academy Award nomination for Best Animated Short Film at the 91st Academy Awards.

The couple's daughter Lily Snowden-Fine is a former child actress who was the original voice of Peppa Pig, and currently works as an artist and illustrator.

Filmography

Short films

Television

References

External links

1960 births
Living people
Canadian animated film directors
Canadian voice directors
Artists from Toronto
Artists from Vancouver
Film directors from Toronto
Film directors from Vancouver
Directors of Best Animated Short Academy Award winners
Directors of Genie and Canadian Screen Award winners for Best Animated Short
Alumni of the National Film and Television School
National Film Board of Canada people